Mario Maiocchi (born 27 April 1913, date of death unknown) was an Italian ice hockey player. He competed in the men's tournament at the 1936 Winter Olympics.

References

1913 births
Year of death missing
Italian ice hockey players
Olympic ice hockey players of Italy
Ice hockey players at the 1936 Winter Olympics
Ice hockey people from Milan